The Pennings is a 2.7 hectare Local Nature Reserve in Eye in Suffolk. It is owned and managed by Mid Suffolk District Council.

This site on the east bank of the River Dove is managed as a hay meadow. Fauna on the river bank include kingfishers and water voles.

There is access from Ludgate Causeway, off Hoxne Road.

References

Local Nature Reserves in Suffolk